Vadim Gayduchenko (born 24 April 1995) is a Belarusian handball player for C' Chartres MHB and the Belarusian national team.

He participated at the 2017 World Men's Handball Championship.

References

External links

1995 births
Living people
People from Babruysk
Belarusian male handball players
Expatriate handball players
Belarusian expatriate sportspeople in France
Belarusian expatriate sportspeople in Romania
Sportspeople from Mogilev Region